The Rushen Heritage Trust is an organisation which aims to build knowledge and appreciation of the heritage, history and landscape of the South of the Isle of Man. It was established in 2014, comprises a number of volunteer-run teams and puts on a number of major exhibitions each year across Rushen sheading.

Establishment
The Trust was established by Hugh and Sandra Davidson, who first formed an initial steering group in October 2013 of Phil Gawne, Laurence Skelly and Juan Watterson (Rushen MHKs) and Steve George (chairman of Port Erin Traders' Association). Following a public consultation, an initial public meeting about the potential formation of the Trust was held in Port St Mary Town Hall on 3 April 2014, where 120 attended and 60 people volunteered to be a part of the Trust. The Trust then appointed Graham Hall as its first Heritage Manager in June 2014, and then officially launched on 25 July 2014, the day it was incorporated and registered as a Charity (939).

Organisation
The Trust is led by volunteers organised into Heritage Actions Teams (HATs) focussing on five key areas of Rushen heritage:

 Tourism
 WWII Internment
 Manx Language, Culture & Art
 Story of the Sea
 Story of the Land

The seven board members of the Trust consist of: Juan Watterson (Chairman), Hugh Davidson (Co-Secretary), Sandra Davidson (Co-Secretary), Laurence Skelly, Phil Gawne, George Noble and Steve George.

Work

The stated purpose of the Trust is "To preserve, enhance, and celebrate the rich heritage of Rushen; and thereby to build wide community involvement."

Unlike other Heritage Trusts on the Isle of Man, the Rushen Heritage Trust occupies no property, as it was identified as uneconomic, difficult to maintain and counter to the aims of the Trust. Instead the Trust stages "pop-up" exhibitions in various locations across the sheading, and operates as a virtual institution. Upon its establishment, Chairperson of the Board, Juan Watterson commented that: "We are looking to build a virtual museum, bringing together all sorts of video, audio, pictures, and also their stories." This was echoed by the founding Heritage Manager, Graham Hall, who proposed that "we use the whole area around us as a museum." The advantage of this approach was felt to be that it would reach a wider audience, have greater longevity and that it would be more attractive to returning visitors.

As well as a number of smaller exhibitions, the Trust has held the following major exhibitions:

 Friend or Foe?: An exhibition marking the 75th anniversary of the opening of the World War II Rushen internment camp for women originating from within the Axis powers. (19 May - 14 June 2015)
 The Glory Days of Rushen Tourism: An exhibition on the history and people of five hotels in Rushen - Bayqueen, Falcons Nest, Belle Vue/Royal, Perwick Bay Hotel and The Bay. (13 – 26 July 2015)

The Trust has also published a book, Illustrated Roll Call, on 18 May 2015: a collection of Christmas greetings from 70 German women internees and presented to their Manx landlady, Marjorie Crighton, in 1940.

References

External links
 The Rushen Heritage Trust website

Cultural organisations based in the Isle of Man
2014 establishments in the United Kingdom
Heritage organisations in the United Kingdom